James Michael Derham (born 1947) is an American diplomat. He served as United States Ambassador to Guatemala from 2005 to 2008.

Biography

Early life
He graduated from Fordham University and received M.A.s from the John F. Kennedy School of Government at Harvard University and George Washington University.

Career
He served as Principal Deputy Assistant Secretary of State for Western Hemisphere Affairs, Deputy Chief of Mission at the U.S. Embassy in Mexico City, Chargé d'Affaires and Deputy Chief of Mission at the U.S. Embassy in Brasília, and Consul General in Rio de Janeiro. He also served in diplomatic positions in Havana, Ciudad Juarez, and Sao Paulo. From September 2005 to April 2008, he served as U.S. Ambassador to Guatemala. In 2010, he served as Deputy Chief of Mission in Lisbon. He also worked as Chief of Party for a USAID project in Pristina, Kosovo, and on Capitol Hill.

From October 2011 to April 2013, he served as Chargé d'Affaires to Venezuela.

Personal life
He is married to Joleen A. Schweitzer, and they have two sons, Michael T. Derham and Christopher D. Derham. In 2010, they bought a house in Williamsburg, Virginia.

References

External links

1947 births
Living people
Fordham University alumni
Harvard Kennedy School alumni
George Washington University alumni
Ambassadors of the United States to Guatemala
People from Williamsburg, Virginia